Sustainment Brigades were created as part of the early 21st century transformation of the United States Army from a division-based structure to a brigade-based army.

Mission

The sustainment brigade is a flexible headquarters that is task organized to support unified land operations and command subordinate sustainment organizations. It is task organized with a combination of combat sustainment support battalions and functional logistics battalions It is a multifunctional headquarters that integrates and employs sustainment units while planning and synchronizing sustainment operations.The sustainment brigade supports Army forces at the tactical and operational levels, providing support to brigade combat teams (BCTs), multifunctional and functional support brigades, deployable, self-contained division and corps headquarters, and other units operating in its assigned support area. The brigade is primarily concerned with the continuous management and distribution of stocks, human resources support, execution of financial management support, and allocation of maintenance in the AO to provide operational reach to maneuver commanders.

Variants 
There are two Sustainment Brigade variants:  Division Sustainment Brigades (DSB) and Echelon-Above-Division (EAD) Sustainment Brigades.  

 Division Sustainment Brigade provides baseline sustainment units, planning, and synchronization within the Division support area. It consistent of standardized Division Sustainment Support Battalion, Division Sustainment Special Troops Battalion, and may be augmented by modular Combat Sustainment Support Battalions depending upon the mission.
 Echelon-Above-Division Sustainment Brigades are modular in nature assigned to an Expeditionary Sustainment Command (ESC) and task organized to operate in the Corps and/or Theater areas.

Echelon Above Division (EAD) Sustainment Brigades

Divisional Sustainment Brigades

References

External links
"Sustainment Units at the Institute of Heraldry"

See also
 Reorganization plan of United States Army
 Coats of arms of U.S. Support Battalions

Sustainment Brigades of the United States Army